Love and Poetry is the first studio album by British psychedelic band Andwella's Dream. It was released in 1969 on CBS Records.

Background
Love and Poetry was composed entirely by band member Dave Lewis. It captures the true original sounds of Irish psychedelic rock. Relatively unknown, this album has achieved certain cult status after 40 years and is eagerly sought after by collectors of the genre.

It is featured in Record Collector's Top 100 British Psychedelic Records of the 1960s.

The producer was Rocky Shahan (Shahan Chowdhury) who played bass in The Konrads, a band which included David Bowie in an early line-up. He represented Pakistan in the V Festival Internacional da Canção in Rio with the song "The Best Man" in 1970.

Track listing
All songs composed by Dave Lewis
"The Days Grew Longer for Love"
"Sunday" 
"Lost a Number Found a King"
"Man Without a Name"
"Clockwork Man"
"Cocaine"
"Shades of Grey"
"High on a Mountain"
"Andwella"
"Midday Sun"
"Take My Road"
"Felix"
"Goodbye"

Personnel
Andwellas Dream
David Lewis - vocals, guitar, keyboards
Nigel Smith - bass guitar, vocals
Gordon Barton - drums
with:
Bob Downes - flute, Chinese bells, tam-tam, finger cymbals, percussion, Chinese Bamboo Flute (ti-tse)
Technical
John Hawkins - executive producer, additional arrangements
Andrew Cameron Miller - executive producer
Michael Cooper, Mike Fitzhenry, Philip Wade - engineer
C. Nevil Boussmayeff - sleeve design

References

External links
Album and Band facts, info and more

1969 albums
Andwella albums
CBS Records albums
Psychedelic rock